Powell STOLport  was a privately owned, public use STOLport in Knox County, Tennessee, United States. It is located five nautical miles (9 km) northwest of the central business district of Knoxville, Tennessee. This facility had a runway designed for use by STOL (short take-off and landing) aircraft.

The airport was annexed by the City of Knoxville in April 2003.

The airport closed in the mid-2000s, and served its final flight in April 2012 when the then-owners sold the last aircraft that had been stored at the facility. It is scheduled to become a shopping center based around a Kroger store.]

Facilities and aircraft 
Powell STOLport covered an area of 30 acres (12 ha) at an elevation of 992 feet (302 m) above mean sea level. It had one runway designated 5/23 with an asphalt surface measuring 2,600 by 50 feet (792 x 15 m).

For the 12-month period ending February 9, 2000, the airport had 1,375 general aviation aircraft operations, an average of 26 per week. At that time there were 5 aircraft based at this airport: 80% single-engine and 20% multi-engine.

References

External links 
 Aerial image as of March 2002 from USGS The National Map
 Aeronautical chart from SkyVector

Defunct airports in Tennessee
Airports in Tennessee
Transportation in Knox County, Tennessee
Buildings and structures in Knox County, Tennessee